Rhabdias ranae is a species of nematode. The species has been described as androdioecious.

References 
 

Animals described in 1929
Rhabditida